Studio Liddell Ltd. is a British computer animation and imagery production studio based in Manchester, UK. It was founded in 1996 by Ian Liddell, Jon Liddell, and Andrew Jones. The company began by producing imagery for advertising and technical purposes and later successfully expanded into children's television creating shows such as Cloudbabies, Ranger Rob, and working on Roary The Racing Car, Let's Play, Raa Raa The Noisy Lion, and Fifi & The Flowertots. In recent years the company has also expanded into Virtual Reality and Augmented Reality technologies.

The company is based across two studios in Central Manchester and MediaCityUK.

TV shows 
 Cloudbabies
 Ranger Rob
Part of co-production
 Roary The Racing Car
 Let's Play
 Raa Raa The Noisy Lion
 Fifi & The Flowertots

Awards and nominations

External links

References 

Privately held companies of England
Companies based in Manchester
Computer animation
British animation studios
Entertainment companies established in 1996
1996 establishments in England